The Hantz House is a historic house at 855 Fairview Drive in Fayetteville, Arkansas.  It is a single-story Mid-Century Modern frame structure, with a two-level flat roof and cantilevered decks projecting from its concrete block foundation.  The exterior is finished in board-and-batten siding, with ribbons of casement windows providing illumination.  The massing of the house has a taller central section, which provides an open-plan public space with kitchen, dining, and living areas, with lower-height private space housing bedrooms and bathroom.  The house was designed by E. Fay Jones while he was an architecture student at the University of Arkansas, and was the first of his designs to be built.  The house was built in 1951 for Katherine and Harold Hantz, the latter then chair of the university's philosophy department.

The house was listed on the National Register of Historic Places in 2001.

See also
National Register of Historic Places listings in Washington County, Arkansas

References

External links

Houses on the National Register of Historic Places in Arkansas
Houses completed in 1950
Houses in Fayetteville, Arkansas
National Register of Historic Places in Fayetteville, Arkansas